James T. Russell (1927 – January 2, 2006) was an American politician. He served as a Republican member of the Florida House of Representatives.

Life and career 
Russell was born in St. Petersburg, Florida, the son of James C. Russell. He attended St. Petersburg High School and served in the United States Navy. He was discharged in 1948, after which he attended St. Petersburg College and Stetson University College of Law.

In 1959, Russell was elected to the Florida House of Representatives, serving until 1965. He was an attorney in Gulfport, Florida.

Russell died on January 2, 2006 of cancer in Tennessee, at the age of 78.

References 

1927 births
2006 deaths
Politicians from St. Petersburg, Florida
Republican Party members of the Florida House of Representatives
20th-century American politicians
St. Petersburg College alumni
Stetson University College of Law alumni
Deaths from cancer in Tennessee